Carlo Carraro (born May 17, 1957, in Italy) is the chancellor of the University of Venice for the three-year period 2009–2012, with a two-year extension of his mandate in accordance to the Gelmini University Law bringing it up to summer 2014. He is also professor of environmental economics at the same university. He is director of the Sustainable Development Programme of the Fondazione Eni Enrico Mattei and director of the Climate Impacts and Policy Division of the Euro-Mediterranean Center for Climate Change (CMCC). In 2008, Carraro was elected vice-chair of the Working Group III and member of the bureau of the Nobel Laureate Intergovernmental Panel on Climate Change (IPCC).

Education
Carlo Carraro holds a Laurea degree in Economics from the University of Venice and a Ph.D. in Economics from Princeton University (USA).

Career
Professor Carraro studies in the field of environmental economics, specifically, researching the evaluation of climate change mitigation and adaptation policy.
He is one of the authors of the Third Assessment Report of the IPCC and he collaborated with the Economic and Social Research Institute (ESRI), Cabinet Office, Government of Japan, with the OECD and with World Bank.

Past Academic Position
Past academic positions include teaching at the University of Paris 1 Pantheon-Sorbonne, LUISS in Rome, University of Udine, University of Aix-en-Provence, University of Nice, University of Paris X, and at the Clemson University MBA School. He has been Vice-Provost for Research Management and Policy at Ca’ Foscari University (2000–2006) and chairman of the Department of Economics (2005–2008).

Fellowship
Carlo Carraro is research fellow of the Center for Economic and Policy Research (CEPR), London, UK and Center for Economic Studies (CESifo), Munich, Germany and associate Research Fellow, Center of Economic Policy Studies (CEPS), Brussels, Belgium.

Scientific Activities
Professor Carraro is member of the International Advisory Board of the Harvard Environmental Economics Program (HEEP) and of the European Research Council Advanced Grants Evaluation Panel. He is also member of the Scientific Committee of the Research Network on Sustainable Development (R2D2), Paris; of the Istituto di Economia e Politica dell'Energia e dell'Ambiente (IEFE), Milan; of the ENI award for Research; of the Kyoto Project of the Fondazione Lombardia Ambiente, Milan. In 2007, he was elected correspondent Resident Member of the Academy “Istituto Veneto di Scienze, Lettere e Arti” (IVSLA) in Venice.

He is member of the Advisory Board of the Ifo Institute for Economic Research at the University of Munich, Germany, of the BP Chair on Sustainable Development, Pontifical University of Comillas, Madrid, Spain and of the Centre for Applied Macroeconomic Analysis, Canberra, Australia. He is member of the Executive Board of VEnice GAteway for Science and Technologies (VEGA), Venice.
He is also member of the Steering Committee of the Ca’ Foscari - Harvard Summer School (CFHSS), the International Energy Workshop (IEW), and the Coalition Theory Network (CTN).
He was the chair of the organising committee of the Annual Conference of the European Association of Environmental and Resource Economists, Venice, 17–20 April 1990 and of the First World Congress of Environmental and Resource Economists, Venice, 25–27 June 1998.

Editorial Boards
Professor Carraro is member of the Editorial Board of the following journals: Review of Environmental Economics and Policy (Oxford University Press), Environmental Modelling and Assessment (Springer Science), Energy Economics (Elsevier), Research in Economics (Elsevier), Integrated Assessment (Springer Science), International Environmental Agreements (Springer Science), International Yearbook of Environmental and Resource Economics (Edward Elgar), Economics Bulletin (Vanderbilt University), E-conomics (Kiel Institute), Equilibri (Il Mulino), Strategic Behavior and the Environment (Nowpublishers).
He is also editor of the FEEM Series on the Economic of Sustainable Development and Co-Editor of the ESRI Series on Environmental Policy with Edgar Elgar.

Research interests
Professor Carraro's research interests cover the following fields: coalition and network formation, analysis of international economic agreements, the link between trade and the environment, development of advanced integrated climate economy models, empirical modelling of technological change, and assessment of the costs and benefits of greenhouse gases stabilization policies.

Publications
Professor Carraro has written more than 200 papers and 30 books on the analysis of monetary and fiscal problems in open economies, monetary policy coordination in Europe, international negotiations and the formation of international economic coalitions, the effects of fiscal policies on oligopolistic markets, the econometric modelling of integrated economies, the econometric valuation of environmental policies to control global warming and further issues related to climate change policies, the dynamics of international environmental agreements, international locations industry and trade flows, global governance, coalition theory and research policies.

Honours
In 2013 Professor Carraro was awarded the decoration of Grand Officer in the Order of Merit of the Italian Republic.

Controversies
In the course of his tenure as Chancellor of Ca Foscari University in Venice, some of his initiatives have been strongly contested by students, faculty and residents.

Chancellor Carraro's decision to invite for the inauguration of 2010-2011 Paolo Scaroni, the managing director of ENI S.p.A., and recipient of a one-year four months suspended sentence for corruption during "tangentopoli" occasioned strong protests.

His decision to invite  Alessandro Profumo, former managing director of Italian bank Unicredit on 23 November 2011, barely a month after the Milan procurators had announced the formulation of charges against Profumo for tax fraud on 27 October 2011, brought renewed protests.

His decision to swap three buildings owned by Venice university, two of which are grade-listed sixteenth century palaces, with a 1957 office block in 2013 also sparked strong dissent and protest.

One of the palaces of the proposed swap is Ca Cappello, the sixteenth century palazzo on the grand Canal that was famously the home of English archeologist and Niniveh discoverer Austen Henry Layard and his wife Lady Enid Layard.
Together with Ca Cappello the swap would also see the alienation of Ca Bembo and Palazzo Cosulich.

The language department have in particular objected to the lack of adequate spaces and the lack of transparency over the operation, which was undertaken without their knowledge and participation. A student demonstration entered the building while an administrative meeting on the building swap was in session, with considerable controversy ensuing later over whether the chancellor pushed one of the demonstrators or was pushed by one. In an unprecedented move, 115 members of faculty petitioned the chancellor to halt the transfer of property and expressed sympathy with the student protesters. The chancellor's decision to request the police to sue the students for interruption of public service brought even stronger condemnation, and 138 members of faculty expressed solidarity with the students being sued. Italian investigative weekly L'Espresso has recently noted the problems over the swap, and the apparent mismatch between estimates, and reconstructed the affair from the beginning.

References

External links
 Prof. Carraro web page
 Prof. Carraro, President of Venice University, web page
 
 Prof. Carraro blog

Italian economists
Living people
1957 births
Sustainability advocates